The Association of Anaesthetists, in full the Association of Anaesthetists of Great Britain and Ireland (AAGBI), is a professional association for anaesthetists in the United Kingdom and Ireland.

It was founded by Dr Henry Featherstone in 1932, when GPs gave most anaesthetics in the UK and Ireland as a sideline. Anaesthetists were not respected by other specialists and were poorly paid. Surgeons provided referrals and collected and paid their fees. The AAGBI's negotiations before the NHS was established in 1948 ensured anaesthetists received consultant status. It instigated the founding of the Faculty of Anaesthetists of the Royal College of Surgeons of England (now the Royal College of Anaesthetists) in 1947 and supported the foundation of the equivalent Faculty of the Royal College of Surgeons in Ireland (now the College of Anaesthesiologists of Ireland in 1959.

The AAGBI adopted the motto in somno securitas (safe in sleep) when it was granted the right to bear arms by King George VI in 1945. Patients and anaesthetists alike can be secure in the knowledge that the Association continues to protect their mutual interests.
The AAGBI office is located in the centre of London.

Past presidents

 1932-35 - Henry W Featherstone OBE MD LLDHon FFARCS
 1935-38 - Joseph Blomfield OBE MD FRCS FFARCS
 1938-41 - Zebulon Mennell FFARCS
 1941-44 - Ashley Daly FRCS FFARCS
 1944-47 - Archibald D Marston CBE MD FRCS FFARCS
 1947-50 - John Gillies CVO MC FRCSEd FFARCS
 1950-53 - W Alexander Low MC FFARCS
 1953-56 - Sir Geoffrey Organe MD FRCS FFARCS FFARACSHon FFARCSIHon
 1956-59 - T Cecil Gray CBE KCSG OStJ MD FRCP FRCS FFARCSHon
 1959-62 - Ronald Jarman DSC FRCS FFARCS
 1962-65 - Vernon F Hall CVO FRCA FFARCSHon
 1965-67 - Herbert H Pinkerton FRCP (Glasg) FFARCS
 1967-69 - R Patrick W Shackleton CBE DM FFARCS
 1969-71 - A John W Beard MD FRCA
 1971-73 - J Alfred Lee FFARCS FFARCSIHon MMSA
 1973-76 - Philip J Helliwell FRCA
 1976-78 - Cyril F Scurr CBE LVO FRCS FRCA FFARCSIHon
 1978-80 - Stanley A Mason FRCA AKC
 1980-82 - W Derek Wylie FRCP FRCS FRCA FANZCAHon
 1982-84 - Michael D Vickers FRCA FANZCAHon
 1984-86 - Thomas B. Boulton OBE TD FRCA FDSRCS
 1986-88 - Michael Rosen CBE FRCS FRCOG FRCA FFARCSIHon
 1988-90 - Maurice M Burrows FRCA
 1990-92 - Peter J F Baskett FRCA MRCP
 1992-94 - William R MacRae FRCSEd, FRCA, FFARCSI
 1994-96 - S Morrell Lyons OBE MD FRCA FFARCSI
 1996-98 - W Leslie M Baird FRCA FRCP (Glasg)
 1998-00 - Maldwyn Morgan MB BS DA FRCA
 2000-02 - Professor Leo Strunin FRCA FRCPC
 2002-04 - Dr Peter G M Wallace FRCA FRCP (Glasg)
 2004-06 - Professor Mike Harmer MD FRCA FCARCSI (Hon)
 2006-08 - Dr David K Whitaker FRCA FFPMRCA FFICM Hon FCARCSI
 2008-10 - Dr Richard J S Birks MB CHB FRCA Hon FCARCSI
 2010-12 - Dr Iain H Wilson MB CHB FFARCS
 2012-14 - Dr William Harrop-Griffiths
 2014-16 - Dr Andrew Hartle
 2016-18 - Dr Paul Clyburn
 2018-20 - Dr Kathleen Ferguson
 2020-present - Dr Mike Nathanson

Education and Meetings

Events

Winter Scientific Meeting (WSM) 
WSM is the Association's largest annual events. Held in London each year, WSM is the leading anaesthetic meeting in the UK with an attendance of around 800 national and international delegates. The scientific programme is led by high-profile speakers and focuses on current issues in anaesthesia. There is an extensive trade exhibition with around 40 leading companies in anaesthetics attending. WSM is aimed at all levels of anaesthetists from trainees to consultants and is a European CPD accredited meeting.

Trainee Conference 
The annual Trainee Conference is the leading trainee scientific meeting in the UK aimed at all levels of trainee anaesthetists from CT1 to ST7. It has an attendance of around 400 delegates each year and gives trainees a great opportunity to network with their colleagues, present their work as an oral presentation or poster and attend hands-on workshops.

Annual Congress 
Annual Congress is the flagship event of the Association and is held in various locations around the UK and Ireland. Annual Congress is one of the leading anaesthetic meetings in the UK with an attendance of around 800-1000 national and international delegates. It features informative sessions, high-profile speakers and an extensive trade exhibition with over 40 leading anaesthetics companies attending. Annual Congress is aimed all levels of anaesthetists from trainees to consultants and is a European CPD accredited meeting.

Seminars 
AAGBI offers educational seminars featuring leading experts in the fields of anaesthesia, critical care and pain medicine who present the latest information on a variety of key anaesthesia topics. Seminars are designed to focus on a specific field of interest within anaesthesia and help to build on specialist interests.

Core Topics 
Core Topics are one- or two-day conferences organised by the Association at different locations around UK and Ireland allowing delegates the chance to update their knowledge in a cost-effective and convenient way.

Learn@ 
Learn@ is an area of the website where members can find educational, learning and CPD resources. They can learn in their own time and keep a record of there completed CPD for use in appraisals and revalidation.

Heritage Centre 
The Anaesthesia Heritage Centre contains the Association's archives, the Anaesthesia Museum and a rare book collection and is open to everyone.

The centre consists of a museum with a collection of over 4,500 objects dating back to 1774, the Association's own archives, which date back to 1932, and a reference library. The museum is a member of The London Museums of Health & Medicine.

Research

Undergraduate Award 
The Wylie Medal is awarded to the most meritorious essay on the topic related to anaesthesia, the topic for the essay question changes year on year. The award is open to undergraduate medical student at a university in Great Britain or Ireland. Prizes of £500, £250 and £150 are awarded to the best three submissions. The overall winners are given the Wylie Medal in memory of Dr W Derek Wylie, President of the Association 1980–82.

SAS Award 
The Association invites applications for the SAS Audit Prize and the SAS Research Prize. These are exclusively for SAS doctors to encourage them to undertake audit and research. Entries will be judged by the Research & Grants Committee of the Association. All SAS doctors who are members of the Association are eligible to apply for the prize.

Innovation 
The  main aims of the Association's Innovation project are to promote innovation in anaesthesia and intensive care, to help individuals in their 'journey' from the concept to the finished product, to facilitate introduction to the medical equipment manufacturers or relevant organisation, to facilitate testing of new equipment or idea and to facilitate marketing of a new product or an idea. It involves holding workshops/clinics and seminars on the subject, having regular features in Anaesthesia News and the best innovations featured in Anaesthesia and having plenary or satellite sessions during Annual Congress and WSM London.

Professionals

Trainees 
The Association of Anaesthetists Trainee Committee (formerly known as GAT - Group of Anaesthetists in Training), is a section of the association which represents the interests of trainee anaesthetists across the UK and Ireland. Trainee members account for around one third of the total membership of the association. The Trainee Committee members are elected and has members sitting on the Board of Directors of the Association and representation on many other committees including the Intensive Care Society Trainee Committee and the British Medical Association Junior Doctors Committee.

SAS 
Staff grade, associate specialist and specialty doctors (SAS) are important members of any department, especially in Anaesthesia, and make an enormous contribution to service work. Doctors enter the SAS grade for many different reasons. Some enter from different training systems as the SAS route provides a means for secure employment; some have child care or family responsibilities and others do not wish to take on the role of consultant with the attendant responsibilities and duties. The Association has grants and prizes designed especially for SAS doctors such as the SAS Audit, Research Prize and the SAS travel grant.

Consultants 
The Association has around 10,000 members, the majority of whom are consultants.

Publications

Guidelines 
The Association publishes guidelines on many topics relating to anaesthesia. Titles include; Best Practice in the Management of Epidural Analgesia in the Hospital Setting, Organising a Year Abroad, Good Anaesthetist - Standards of Practice for Career Grade Anaesthetists and many others.

Anaesthesia 
Anaesthesia is the official journal of the Association and is international in scope and comprehensive in coverage. It publishes original, peer-reviewed articles on all aspects of general and regional anaesthesia, intensive care and pain therapy, including research on equipment. Although primarily a clinical journal, it welcomes submissions of basic science papers if the authors can demonstrate their clinical relevance.

Anaesthesia News 
Anaesthesia News is the official newsletter of the Association. Regular features include reports from the officers and president, items specific to trainees, a history page, a specialist society page, letters to the editor and an editorial.

Anaesthesia Reports 
Anaesthesia Reports is an official journal of the Association of Anaesthetists. It is international in scope and publishes original, peer-reviewed case reports, media content, and associated papers on all aspects of anaesthesia, peri-operative medicine, intensive care and pain therapy.

References

External links
 Official website

1932 establishments in the United Kingdom
Medical associations based in the United Kingdom
Anesthesiology organizations
Health in the City of Westminster
Organisations based in the City of Westminster
Science museums in London
Medical museums in London
Museums in the City of Westminster
Organizations established in 1932